Bekirler can refer to:

 Bekirler, Babadağ
 Bekirler, Bayramiç
 Bekirler, Nazilli
 Bekirler, Yığılca